Gastón Giménez may refer to:

 Gastón Giménez (footballer, born 1989), Uruguayan footballer
 Gastón Giménez (footballer, born 1991), Argentine-Paraguan footballer